In enzymology, a linamarin synthase is an enzyme that catalyzes the chemical reaction

UDP-glucose + 2-hydroxy-2-methylpropanenitrile  UDP + linamarin

Thus, the two substrates of this enzyme are UDP-glucose and 2-hydroxy-2-methylpropanenitrile, whereas its two products are UDP and linamarin.

This enzyme belongs to the family of glycosyltransferases, specifically the hexosyltransferases.  The systematic name of this enzyme class is UDP-glucose:2-hydroxy-2-methylpropanenitrile beta-D-glucosyltransferase. Other names in common use include uridine diphosphoglucose-ketone glucosyltransferase, uridine diphosphate-glucose-ketone cyanohydrin, beta-glucosyltransferase, UDP glucose ketone cyanohydrin glucosyltransferase, UDP-glucose:ketone cyanohydrin beta-glucosyltransferase, and uridine diphosphoglucose-ketone cyanohydrin glucosyltransferase.

References

 

EC 2.4.1
Enzymes of unknown structure